The 2000 congressional elections in Florida were held on November 7, 2000, to determine who would represent the state of Florida in the United States House of Representatives. Representatives are elected for two-year terms; those elected served in the 107th Congress from January 3, 2001, until January 3, 2003. The election coincided with the 2000 United States presidential election.

At the time, Florida had twenty-three seats in the House, apportioned according to the 1990 United States Census. Its delegation to the 106th Congress of 1999-2001 consisted of fifteen Republicans and eight Democrats. No seats switched parties in 2000, though the incumbents in Districts 4, 8, and 12 retired. Thus, Florida's delegation to the 107th Congress consisted of fifteen Republicans and eight Democrats. The election for 8th and 22nd districts were competitive, with both decided by a margin of less than 2%. The latter district, which was based in the Miami area, underwent a recount in the midst of a controversial recount of votes for the presidential election.

The Primary election was held September 5, 2000, while the General election was held November 7, 2000. Florida did not have early voting until 2004, in response to the presidential election in 2000.

Overview
The table below shows the total number and percentage of votes, as well as the number of seats gained and lost by each political party in the election for the United States House of Representatives in Florida. All vote totals come from the Florida Secretary of State's website along with the individual counties' election department websites.

Districts

District 1

Republican Joe Scarborough was first elected in 1994 and decided to seek a fourth term in 2000. During the primary, Scarborough was challenged by Pensacola attorney David Condon. As expected, Scarborough prevailed over Condon, winning by a margin of 77.4%-22.6%. This was the only seat tantamount to the election in Florida, because the winner of the Republican primary would face no Democratic opposition. In the general election on November 7, 2000, Scarborough received only token opposition from four write-in candidates - Dave Blue, Mark Coutu, Fred Hoole, and Dudley Wiley. Scraborough won the election with 99.5% of the vote. 
Primary election results

General election results

District 2

Incumbent Allen Boyd, who had been in office since 1997, sought a third term during this election cycle. He faced no challenges for the Democratic nomination. Likewise, Republican Doug Dodd received no opposition in his respective primary. Thomas A. Frederick also entered the race as a write-in candidate. Boyd prevailed in this then-left leaning district, winning with 72.1% of the vote.
General election results

District 3

As in District 2, neither incumbent Corrine Brown (D) or Jennifer Carroll (R) faced opposition in their respective primaries. Write-in candidate Carl Sumner also entered the race. On election day, Brown defeated future-Lieutenant Governor Carroll and Sumner by comfortable margin, receiving 57.6% of the vote in this left-leaning district.
General election results

District 4

Incumbent Tillie K. Fowler (R) declined to run for re-election in 2000, leaving an open seat. The two candidates in the Republican primary were CEO and President of America’s Choice Title Company Dan Quiggle and Ander Crenshaw, President of the Florida Senate and son-in law of former Governor of Claude R. Kirk, Jr. Crenshaw easily defeated Quiggle and received over two-thirds of the votes. Former Jacksonville mayor Tommy Hazouri, Jacksonville City County President Eric Smith, and former State Representative Mike Langton considered running for the Democratic nomination, but all declined, leaving only Jacksonville lawyer Kevin Sanders and businessman Tom Sullivan. On the day of the primary, Sullivan won, garnering about 62.2% of the vote. In addition, independent Deborah K. Pueschel and write-in candidate Vince W. Ray entered the race. Republican Crenshaw soundly defeated Sullivan, Pueschel, and Ray on election day.
Primary election results

General election results

District 5

Democratic incumbent Karen Thurman ran for a fifth term in 2000. She went unchallenged in the primary for her party's nomination. However, the Republican primary featured a tough contest between Pete Enwall and Jim King, both of whom were businessmen from Gainesville. During the week before the primary, the St. Petersburg Times hosted a candidate forum between Enwall and King. Enwall claimed that King's campaign fliers distorted his views on social issues and accused King of mudslinging. On the day of the primary, Enwall narrowly defeated King, garnering about 51.4% of the vote. Write-in candidate Don Johnson also entered in the general election. Thurman trounced Enwall and Johnson, receiving nearly two-thirds of the vote.
Primary election results

General election results

District 6

Republican Cliff Stearns, who had been in office since 1989, ran for a seventh term in 2000. He faced no primary challengers or a Democratic candidate in the general election. Timothy Clower, a Jacksonville taxi business owner and a write-in candidate for this election, intended to use the term limits issue against Stearns, as he promised in 1988 that he would serve only six terms. Barbara Elliott of Bradenton also ran as a write-in candidate. The term limits issue failed to gain traction, as Stearns was re-elected almost unanimously, winning approximately 99.9% of the votes.
General election results

District 7

Republican John Mica has been elected every two years since 1992. He sought re-election again in 2000. Mica faced did not face a primary challenge; neither did his Democratic opponent, Dan Vaughen, a DeLand lawyer and ethics in law professor at the University of Central Florida. Additionally, Norman E. Nelson was eligible as a write-in candidate. Mica was endorsed by the Orlando Sentinel, which noted that "John Mica is the kind of representative others should strive to be." Mica prevailed in a landslide, collecting about 63.2% of the votes.
General election results

District 8

Republican Bill McCollum, who was first elected to this district in 1992, decided to run for the Senate seat of retiring incumbent Connie Mack III. This allowed for a very competitive Republican primary. By as early as August 1999, four candidates declared for the Republican nomination, including businessman Bob Hering, attorney Ric Keller, Orlando attorney Hector "Tico" Perez, and State Representative Bill Sublette. However, Perez withdrew from the race in December, around the time that then-State Senator Daniel Webster declined to run. 
Primary election results

Run-off election results

General election results

District 9

Republican Michael Bilirakis, first elected to the seat in 1982, sought another term in 2000. He was not challenged for the Republican nomination, nor did he face a Democratic opponent in the general election. Instead, Reform Party member Jon Duffey and write-in candidate Marie Ospina entered the race. Bilirakis won overwhelmingly, receiving 81.9% of the votes.
General election results

References

External links
Florida Department of State's election results archive

2000
Florida
2000 Florida elections